The Kilkenny Senior Hurling Championship (known for sponsorship reasons as the St Canice's Credit Union Senior Hurling Championship and abbreviated to the Kilkenny SHC) is an annual hurling competition organised by the Kilkenny County Board of the Gaelic Athletic Association and contested by the top-ranking senior clubs in the county of Kilkenny in Ireland. It is the most prestigious competition in Kilkenny hurling.

Introduced in 1887 as the Kilkenny Hurling Championship, it was initially a straight knockout tournament open only to senior-ranking club teams. The championship has gone through a number of changes throughout the years, including the use of a round robin, before reverting to a straight knockout format.

In its current format, the Kilkenny Senior Championship begins in September with a first round series of games comprising eight teams, while the four remaining teams receive byes to the quarter-final stage. A team's finishing position in the Kilkenny Senior Hurling League determines at what stage they enter the championship. Four rounds of games are played, culminating with the final match at Nowlan Park in October. The winner of the Kilkenny Senior Championship, as well as being presented with the Tom Walsh Cup, qualifies for the subsequent Leinster Club Championship.

The competition has been won by 26 teams, 18 of which have won it more than once. Tullaroan and Ballyhale Shamrocks are the most successful teams in the tournament's history, having won it 20 times each. Ballyhale Shamrocks are the reigning champions, having beaten James Stephens by 1–21 to 2–11 in the 2022 final.

History

Beginnings
Following the foundation of the Gaelic Athletic Association in 1884, new rules for Gaelic football and hurling were drawn up and published in the United Irishman newspaper. County committees were established over the next few years, with the Kilkenny County Board affiliating on 30 January 1887. The inaugural championship was contested by just four clubs, with Tullaroan winning the title after a defeat of Mooncoin. Since then the championship title has been awarded every year except on a handful of occasions. No championships took place in 1891, 1892 and 1912, while several championships between 1916 and 1922 were either cancelled or unfinished due to the Irish revolutionary period. The 1916 championship began in October 1916, however, because of martial law it wasn't completed until June 1919. It was decreed that the winner of the match would be declared champions for all three years.

Team dominance
The first fifty years of the championship were dominated by Tullaroan and Mooncoin who built up an intense rivalry. Both clubs shared 28 championship titles between 1887 and 1936, however, since then they have won just four titles between them. Other clubs who enjoyed limited periods of dominance during this time include city-based club Confederation, who won three titles between 1893 and 1896, and Dicksboro who won two titles from four final appearances during the 1920s. Carrickshock's dominance saw the club play in ten finals between 1938 and 1948, becoming the first team to win four successive championships from 1940 to 1943. Éire Óg also claimed four titles during this period. After a sixty-year hiatus Bennettsbridge returned to winning ways and claimed ten championship titles between 1952 and 1967. Fenians added their name to roll of honour in 1970 before claiming four more championships before the end of the decade. In 1978 Ballyhale Shamrocks became the latest first-time champions and ushered in a new era of dominance by winning 10 more championship titles by 1991. As Ballyhale went into decline, Glenmore dominated the nineties by winning five championships between 1987 and 1999. The first decade of the new century saw O'Loughlin Gaels and James Stephens win two titles apiece, while Ballyhale Shamrocks ended the decade with four successive championships before winning four more in 2012, 2014, 2018 and 2019.

The championship

Overview
The Kilkenny County Championship is a single elimination tournament. Each team is afforded just one defeat before being eliminated from the championship. Pairings for matches are drawn at random, however, there is a certain level of seeding based on league performance. The league begins with two groups of six teams. The top two teams in each group receive a bye into the quarter-finals, while third placed team plays the fourth placed team, and the fifth placed team plays the sixth placed team in the first round. The losers of the latter games enter a relegation play-off.

Each match is played as a single leg. If a match is drawn there is a replay. If both sides are still level at the end of the replay there is a period of extra time and so on until a winner is found.

Format
First round: 8 teams contest this round. The 4 winning teams advance directly to the quarter-final stage. The 4 losing teams are eliminated from the championship.

Quarter-finals: Eight teams contest this round. The four winning teams advance directly to the semi-final stage. The four losing teams are eliminated from the championship.

Semi-finals: Four teams contest this round. The two winning teams advance directly to the final. The two losing teams are eliminated from the championship.

Final: The final is contested by the two semi-final winners.

Participating teams
The following 12 teams participated in the 2021 championship:

Sponsorship
Since 1991 the Kilkenny County Championship has been sponsored by the St Canice's Credit Union.

Managers
Managers in the Kilkenny Championship are involved in the day-to-day running of the team, including the training, team selection, and sourcing of players. Their influence varies from club-to-club and is related to the individual club committees. The manager is assisted by a team of two or three selectors and a backroom team consisting of various coaches.

List of finals

 1979 - The first match ended in a draw: Ballyhale Shamrocks, 0–14, Erin's Own 0–14.
 1980 - The first match ended in a draw: Ballyhale Shamrocks, 3–10, Muckalee/Ballyfoyle Rovers 2–13.
 1993 - The first match ended in a draw: Dicksboro 0–12, Fenians 0–12.
 1996 - The first match ended in a draw: Young Irelands 2–10, James Stephens 0–16.
 2003 - The first match ended in a draw: O'Loughlin Gaels 3-09, Young Irelands 2–12.
 2011 - The first match ended in a draw: James Stephens 1-08, Ballyhale Shamrocks 0–11.

Finals listed by year

Notes:
 1887 - Goal outweighed any number of points.
 1906 - Mooncoin awarded title.
 1917-18 - Combined with 1916 Championship.
 1919 - Tullaroan and Mooncoin failed to agree on a venue, declared null and void.
 1927 (First game) - Late goal scored after final whistle. Replay agreed.
 1927 (Replay) - Objection, replay agreed.
 1927 (Second Replay) - Unfinished due to conditions.
 1979 - Game unfinished. Ballyhale awarded the title.

Top winners

Records

Teams

By decade
The most successful team of each decade, judged by number of Kilkenny Senior Hurling Championship titles, is as follows:

 1880s: 2 for Tullaroan (1887–89)
 1890s: 3 each for Tullaroan (1895-97-99) and Confederation (1893-94-96)
 1900s: 4 for Tullaroan (1901-02-04-07)
 1910s: 3 for Tullaroan (1910-11-15)
 1920s: 3 for Mooncoin (1927-28-29)
 1930s: 3 for Tullaroan (1930-33-34)
 1940s: 4 for Carrickshock (1940-41-42-43)
 1950s: 5 for Bennettsbridge (1952-53-55-56-59)
 1960s: 5 for Bennettsbridge (1960-62-64-66-67)
 1970s: 5 for Fenians (1970-72-73-74-77)
 1980s: 6 for Ballyhale Shamrocks (1980-82-83-85-88-89)
 1990s: 4 for Glenmore (1990-92-95-99)
 2000s: 4 for Ballyhale Shamrocks (2006-07-08-09)
 2010s: 4 for Ballyhale Shamrocks (2012-14-18-19)
 2020s: 3 for Ballyhale Shamrocks (2020-21-22)

Most consecutive wins

Most consecutive appearances

Gaps/wins
Top ten longest gaps between championship titles:

 62 years: Bennettsbridge (1890-1952)
 43 years: Dicksboro (1950-1993)
 36 years: Tullaroan (1958-1994)
 32 years: James Stephens (1937-1969)
 29 years: Mooncoin (1936-1965)
 27 years: Clara (1986-2013)
 24 years: Dicksboro (1993-2017)
 24 years: Dicksboro (1926-1950)
 23 years: James Stephens (1981-2004)
 15 years: Ballyhale Shamrocks (1991-2006)

Gaps/appearances
Top ten longest gaps between appearances in a final (bold denotes a win):

 67 years: John Lockes (1890-1957)
 62 years: Bennettsbridge (1890-1952)
 59 years: Carrickshock (1951-2010)
 44 years: Bennettsbridge (1974-2018)
 43 years: Dicksboro (1950-1993)
 34 years: Tullaroan (1958-1992)
 32 years: James Stephens (1937-1969)
 23 years: Clara (1990-2013)
 21 years: Glenmore (1964-1985)
 21 years: Thomastown (1946-1967)
 21 years: Thomastown (1967-1988)

Most appearances in final

Most regular pairing in finals

Biggest wins
 The most one sided Kilkenny finals since 1896 when goals were made equal to three points:
 24 points – 1902: Tullaroan 3-16 (25) – 0-01 (1) Mooncoin
 23 points – 1904: Tullaroan 6-14 (32) – 1-6 (9) Piltown
 21 points – 2020: Ballyhale Shamrocks 5-19 (34) – 1-10 (13) Dicksboro
 18 points – 1908: Mooncoin 5-17 (32) – 3-05 (14) Threecastles
 17 points – 1955: Benettsbridge 6-06 (24) – 1-04 (7) Mooncoin
 17 points – 1988: Ballyhale Shamrocks 2-15 (21) – 0-04 (4) Thomastown
 16 points – 1934: Tullaroan 6-06 (24) – 1-04 (7) Carrickshock
 16 points – 1969: James Stephens 8-05 (29) – 2-07 (13) Fenians
 15 points – 1915: Tullaroan 7-02 (23) – 2-02 (8) Dicksboro
 15 points – 1923: Dicksboro 7-04 (25) – 3-01 (10) Mooncoin
 14 points – 1944: Eire Og 7-09 (30) – 4.04 (16) Carrickshock
 14 points – 1964: Bennettsbridge 4-09 (21) - 1-04 (7) Glenmore
 14 points – 1991: Ballyhale Shamrocks 3-16 (25) – 1-08 (11) St. Martin's

Top scorers/team

Final

NOTES:
1950 - Drawn match
1973 - Highest score by a losing team

Top scorers

FINALS from 1995 to 2019

By year

Finals

References

External links
Official Kilkenny GAA Website
Kilkenny Club Forum
Kilkenny Club GAA

 
Hurling competitions in Leinster
Kilkenny GAA club championships
Hurling competitions in County Kilkenny
Senior hurling county championships